Pseudemoia entrecasteauxii, also known commonly as Entrecasteaux's skink, the southern grass skink, the tussock cool-skink, and the tussock skink, is a species of lizard in the family Scincidae. The species is endemic to Australia.

Geographic range
P. entrecasteauxii is found in the south-east of the continent of Australia, as well as in Tasmania and the islands of Bass Strait.

Habitat
Although it occurs in a variety of habitats, P. entrecasteauxii is most commonly found in open grassy woodlands.

Longevity
The southern grass skink has a lifespan of about 5 or 6 years.

Description
Male skinks change colouration during the breeding season.

Etymology
The specific name, entrecasteauxii, is in honor of French naval officer and explorer Antoine Bruni d'Entrecasteaux.

Reproductive biology
The southern grass skink has become a model species for reproductive biology in reptiles because it gives birth to live young and exhibits non-invasive epitheliochorial placentation. Unlike the majority of live bearing reptiles, Pseudemoia develop complex placentae, which provide a substantial amount of nutrients to the embryo through pregnancy. Pregnancy in squamates is supported by the evolution of a novel state of gene regulation.   The amount of nutrients provided is dependent on the amount of food females consume during pregnancy, and, unlike other live-bearing reptiles, scarcity of food during pregnancy can cause developmental failure.  When food is limiting, females will also cannibalize their offspring.  Together, these results suggest that placental nutrient transport may only be a successful mode of reproduction if food is abundant throughout pregnancy, which may limit its opportunities to evolve in some reptiles. Lipid transport in this species most likely occurs through the yolk sac placenta and is facilitated in part by the production of the protein lipoprotein lipase. The first observation of an  extra-uterine pregnancy in a reptile was found in this species. The extra-uterine embryo did not invade maternal tissue, suggesting fundamental differences between the nature and evolution of placentation in the southern grass skink and eutherian mammals.

References

Further reading
Boulenger GA (1887). Catalogue of the Lizards in the British Museum (Natural History). Second Edition. Volume III. Lacertidæ, Gerrhosauridæ, Scincidæ, Anelytropidæ, Dibamidæ, Chamæleontidæ. London: Trustees of the British Museum (Natural History). (Taylor and Francis, printers). xii + 575 pp. + Plates I–XL. (Lygosoma entrecasteauxii, pp. 276–277).
Duméril AMC, Bibron G (1839). Erpétologie générale ou Histoire naturelle complète des Reptiles. Tome cinquième [Volume 5]. Paris: Roret. viii + 854 pp. (Lygosoma entrecasteauxii, new species, p. 717) (in French).
Greer AE (1974). "The generic relationships of the Scincid lizard genus Leiolopisma and its relatives". Australian Journal of Zoology, Supplemental Series 22 (31): 1–67. (Leiolopisma entrcasteauxii, new combination, p. 16).
Hutchinson MN, Donnellan SC, Baverstock PR, Krieg M, Simms S, Burgin S (1990). "Immunological relationships and generic revision of the Australian lizards assigned to the genus Leiolopisma (Scincidae: Lygosominae)". Australian J. Zool. 38 (5): 535–554. (Pseudemoia entrecasteauxii, new combination).

Pseudemoia
Skinks of Australia
Reptiles described in 1839
Taxa named by André Marie Constant Duméril
Taxa named by Gabriel Bibron